Hóp may refer to:
 Hóp (Iceland), an Icelandic lake
 Hóp (Vinland), a Viking name for what was possibly a part of the North American Atlantic coast